Samuel Mathias (born 23 December 1996) is a Nigerian international footballer who plays for Lobi Stars, as a midfielder.

Career
He has played club football for Gombe United and Kano Pillars.

He made his international debut for Nigeria in 2017.

References

External links

1996 births
Living people
Nigerian footballers
Nigeria international footballers
Gombe United F.C. players
Kano Pillars F.C. players
El-Kanemi Warriors F.C. players
Lobi Stars F.C. players
Akwa United F.C. players
Association football midfielders